The Technical High School of Campinas (COTUCA), maintained by the University of Campinas, in Campinas, São Paulo, Brazil, is a school that provides free of charge courses at secondary education level on Nursing, Computer Sciences, Mechanical, Electrical, Foods Technology, Environment, Plastics, Labor Security, Medical Equipment, Telecommunications, Quality and Productivity Management, Mechanical Projects Assisted by Computer and Metallic Materials.

Location
The building of COTUCA is a historical heritage of the city of Campinas, and was built in 1918 by Benedict Quirino, a project by architect Ramos de Azevedo. The State University of Campinas—UNICAMP—began its operation in this building in 1967, with the courses of Chemistry, Food Engineering and Medicine. In the same year the COTUCA began to work with the courses of Electrotechnics, Mechanics and Food.

The facilities have 6,500 square meters and, as a historical heritage are preserved and maintained in accordance with its original features.

The building also houses the Unisoft, junior company of the course of computing.

It is at address 177 Culto a Ciencia Street in a historic building.

Courses offered

Mode: A – Internal concomitance
 Food
 Code: 25
 Shift: full day
 Vacancies: 40
 Duration: 3 years' probation
 Stage: 720 hours
 Electronics
 Code: 26
 Shift: full day
 Vacancies: 40
 Duration: 3 years' probation
 Stage: 720 hours
 Code: 35
 Shift: Night
 Vacancies: 40
 Duration: 4 years to the stage
 Stage: 720 hours
 Nursing
 Code: 27
 Shift: full day
 Vacancies: 40
 Duration: 3 years now with 700 hours of training
 Software – Information Systems and Support (formerly Data Processing)
 Code: 28
 Shift: full day
 Vacancies: 40
 Duration: 3 years' probation
 Stage: 400 hours
 Mechanics – Automation and Control
 Code: 29
 Shift: full day
 Vacancies: 40
 Duration: 3 years' probation
 Stage: 720 hours
 Code: 36
 Shift: Night
 Vacancies: 40
 Duration: 4 years' probation
 Stage: 720 hours

Mode: B – Foreign concomitance
 Information Technology – Programming and Internet
 Code: 30
 Shift: evening
 Vacancies: 40
 Duration: 2 years' probation
 Stage: 400 hours
 Code: 42
 Shift: Night
 Vacancies: 40
 Duration: 2 years' probation
 Stage: 400 hours
 Plastics
 Code: 31
 Shift: morning
 Vacancies: 30
 Duration: 2 years' probation
 Stage: 320 hours
 Code: 44
 Shift: Night
 Vacancies: 40
 Duration: 2 years' probation
 Stage: 320 hours
 Labor Safety
 Code: 53
 Shift: Night
 Vacancies: 40
 Duration: 2 years' probation
 Stage: 460 hours

Mode: C – subsequent to High School
 Environmental Technician
 Code: 32
 Shift: Night
 Vacancies: 30
 Duration: 2 years' probation
 Stage: 460 hours
 Electronics
 Code: 40
 Shift: Night
 Vacancies: 40
 Duration: 2 years' probation
 Stage: 720 hours
 Nursing
 Code: 49
 Shift: evening
 Vacancies: 30
 Duration: 2 years of probation with 700 hours
 Hospital-Medical Equipment
 Code: 51
 Shift: Night
 Vacancies: 40
 Duration: 1 year more stage
 Stage: 480 hours
 Prerequisite: Have Vocational Training in electronics, Electrotechnics, or Mechatronics Industrial Computers
 Mechanics – Automation and Control
 Code: 43
 Shift: Night
 Vacancies: 40
 Duration: 2 years' probation
 Stage: 720 hours
 Telecommunications
 Code: 45
 Shift: Night
 Vacancies: 40
 Duration: 2 years' probation
 Stage: 720 hours

Sport: D – Technical Expertise
 Management for Quality and Productivity
 Code: 52
 Shift: Night
 Vacancies: 40
 Duration: 1 year
 Prerequisite: Be Technical Level Middle trained professional in any area
 Mechanical Computer Aided Projects
 Code: 54
 Shift: Night
 Vacancies: 30
 Duration: 1 year
 Prerequisite: Be Technical Level Middle trained in vocational Industry
 Metallic Materials
 Code: 55
 Shift: Night
 Vacancies: 20
 Duration: 1 year
 Prerequisite: Be Technical Level Middle trained in Mechanical, Plastics, Metallurgy and Chemistry

See also
State University of Campinas
Technical College of Limeira

University of Campinas
Schools in Brazil